Miss World 1975, the 25th edition of the Miss World pageant, was held on 20 November 1975 at the Royal Albert Hall in London, UK. 67 contestants took part in the pageant won by Wilnelia Merced of Puerto Rico. She was crowned by Anneline Kriel of South Africa. Runner-up was Germany, Marina Langer, third place was Vicki Harris representing the United Kingdom, fourth place was Maricela Maxie Clark of Cuba, and Yugoslavia's Ladija Verkovska completed the top five.

25th anniversary and returning winners 

To celebrate the competition's twenty-fifth anniversary, ten previous Miss World's were invited to attend the broadcast and were presented during the show, in reverse order, starting with the most recent winner. They were: Belinda Green (Australia 1972), Reita Faria (India 1966), Ann Sidney (UK 1964) who performed the opening cabaret, Carole Crawford (Jamaica 1963), Rosemarie Frankland (UK 1961), Corine Rottschäfer (Netherlands 1959), Penelope Coelen (South Africa 1958), Susana Duijm (Venezuela 1955), Denise Perrier (France 1953) and the very first Miss World, Kiki Håkansson (Sweden 1951) who was also one of the judging panel. Additionally, the current title holder (who was not presented with the other winners) Anneline Kriel made a brief appearance to crown the winner. Whether it was planned or simply coincidental, 1973 winner Marjorie Wallace (USA), the only dethroned winner of the title to date, was also in London and created headlines when she spoke to the press at a conference she arranged from a neighbouring hotel to the contestants. Wallace claimed not to be upset about not being asked to the reunion and offered advice to the new winner: "Get yourself a good lawyer!".

Results

Placements

Contestants

  – Lydia Gloria Johnstone
  – Lilian Noemí De Asti
  – Cynthia Marlene Bruin
  – Anne Davidson
  – Rosemarie Holzschuh
  – Ava Marilyn Burke
  – Peta Hazel Greaves
  – Christine Delmelle
  – Donna Louise Wright
  – María Mónica Guardia
  – Zaida Souza Costa
  – Normande Jacques
  – Amanda Amaya Correa
  – María Mayela Bolaños Ugalde
  – Maricela Clark
  – Elvira Nelly Maria Bakker
  – Pia Isa Lauridsen
  – Carmen Rosa Arredondo Pou
  – Ana Stella Comas Durán
  – Leena Kaarina Vainio
  – Sophie Sonia Perin
  – Marina Langner
  – Lillian Anne Lara
  – Bella Adamopoulou
  – Dora Ann Quintanilla Camacho
  – Carol Dawn Le Billon
  – Joelle Apollon
  – Barbara Ann Neefs
  – Etelinda Mejía Velásquez
  – Teresa Chu Tsui-Kuen
  – Halldóra Björk Jónsdóttir
  – Anjana Sood
  – Elaine Rosemary O'Hara
  – Atida Mor
  – Vanna Bortolini
  – Chiharu Fujiwara
  – Susan Maxwell de Gruchy
  – Lee Sung-hee
  – Ramona Karam
  – Marie Thérèse Manderschied
  – Fauziah Haron
  – Marie Grace Ciantar
  – Marielle Tse Sik-Sun
  – Blanca Patricia López Esparza
  – Janet Andrea Nugent
  – María Auxiliadora Mantilla
  – Sissel Gulbrandsen
  – Mary Orfanides Canakis
  – Suzanne Gonzalez
  – Wilnelia Merced 
  – Sophia St. Omer
  – Amelie Lydia Michel
  – Maggie Siew Teen Sim
  – Rhoda Rademeyer
  – Angela Seneviratne
  – Vinah Thembi Mamba
  – Agneta Catharina Magnusson
  – Franziska Angst
  – Raevadee Pattamaphong
  – Donna Sandra Dalrymple
  – Monia Dida
  – Harika Degirmenci
  – Vicki Ann Harris
  – Annelise Ilschenko
  – Carmen Abal
  – María Concepción Alonso Bustillo
  – Lidija Velkovska

Notes

Debuts

Returns

Last competed in 1955:
 
Last competed in 1965:
 
 
Last competed in 1971:
 
Last competed in 1973:

Withdrawals
  –  Olga Fernández Pérez promptly withdrew from the competition, after an announcement that Francisco Franco, the ruler of Spain, had died on the morning of the pageant date. Pageant organizers concerned that she had been too upset by Franco's death to appear in the finals.

Replacements
  – Anna Vitale was replaced by Vanna Bortolini, her first runner-up of the Miss Italy beauty pageant, because she decided to return home to take care of her ill mother.
  – Rhoda Rademeyer was the second runner-up of Miss South Africa beauty pageant. The official titleholder of this pageant, Helga Vera Johns, was disqualified by the Miss World organizers when it was discovered that she came from Rhodesia. Her Rhodesian nationality apparently violated the pageant's rules. The first runner-up, Crystal Coopers, went to London, but her father would not allow her to compete there because it was discovered that Vera Johns was not going to be officially stripped of her title. This was the second time Helga Vera Johns was barred from competing in the Miss World contest and still to this day remains the only contestant to be barred at least twice from competing at Miss World. The first time was in 1972 when she tried to compete as Miss Rhodesia but was not allowed to compete due to her Rhodesian nationality.

References

External links
 Pageantopolis – Miss World 1975

Miss World
1975 in London
1975 beauty pageants
Beauty pageants in the United Kingdom
Events at the Royal Albert Hall
November 1975 events in the United Kingdom